Wales Center is a hamlet in Erie County, New York, United States. Wales Center has a post office with ZIP code 14169, which opened on November 9, 1842.

References

Hamlets in Erie County, New York
Hamlets in New York (state)